Sulpicius Florus was a 1st-century Briton who served as an auxiliary infantryman in the Roman Army. He was given Roman citizenship by the emperor Galba and adopted his benefactor's gentile name,  Sulpicius.  However, he took part in Otho's coup against Galba in 69, and was one of the murderers of Galba's heir, Lucius Calpurnius Piso Licinianus.

See also
 Sulpicia (gens)

Sources
Tacitus, Histories 1.43

Briton people
Celtic warriors
1st-century Romans
Sulpicii